Guédiawaye FC is football club from Senegal based in Dakar. They are a member of the Senegal Premier League They play their home games at Stade Ibrahima Boye.

Achievements
Senegal Premier League: 0

Senegal FA Cup: 0

Coupe de la Ligue: 1
 2014.

Coupe de l'Assemblée Nationale du Sénégal: 0

Trophée des Champions du Sénégal: 0

Super Coupe du Sénégal: 0

Squad

  

Football clubs in Senegal
1993 establishments in Senegal
Association football clubs established in 1993